Jakobson is a patronymic surname meaning "son of Jakob". Notable people with the surname include:

August Jakobson (1904–1963), Estonian writer
Carl Robert Jakobson (1841–1882), Estonian journalist, writer, politician and teacher
Eduard Magnus Jakobson (1847–1903), Estonian wood engraver
Gregg Jakobson (born 1939), American songwriter
Idel Jakobson (1904–1997), Latvian NKVD investigator
Lars Jakobson (born 1959), Swedish author
Lars Jakobson Thingnæsset (1760–1829), Norwegian farmer and politician
Leo Jakobson (born 1953), Estonian curler 
Maarja Jakobson (born 1977), Estonian actress 
Max Jakobson (1923–2013), Finnish diplomat
Peeter Jakobson (1854–1899), Estonian writer 
Roman Jakobson (1896–1982), Russian linguist

Estonian-language surnames
Patronymic surnames
Surnames from given names